The South Korea men's national under-18 ice hockey team is the men's national under-18 ice hockey team of South Korea. The team is controlled by the Korea Ice Hockey Association, a member of the International Ice Hockey Federation. The team represents South Korea at the IIHF World U18 Championships. South Korea won two gold, six silver, and six bronze medals at the IIHF Asian Oceanic U18 Championships.

The team holds the record of the largest victory in the sport. South Korea beat Thailand in the 1998 IIHF Asian Oceanic Junior U18 Championship 92–0.

International competitions

IIHF Asian Oceanic U18 Championships

1984:  3rd place
1985:  2nd place
1986:  3rd place
1987: 5th place
1988:  3rd place
1989:  2nd place
1990:  3rd place
1991: 4th place
1992: 4th place

1993:  3rd place
1994:  2nd place
1995: 4th place
1996:  2nd place
1997:  3rd place
1998:  1st place
1999:  2nd place
2000:  2nd place
2001:  1st place
2002: Did not participate

IIHF World U18 Championships

 
2002: 1st in Division III
2003: 1st in Division II Group A
2004: 6th in Division I Group B
2005: 1st in Division II Group A
2006: 6th in Division I Group B
2007: 2nd in Division II Group B
2008: 2nd in Division II Group A
2009: 1st in Division II Group A
2010: 5th in Division I Group A
2011: 6th in Division I Group B

2012: 1st in Division II Group A 
2013: 6th in Division I Group B
2014: 2nd in Division II Group A
2015: 1st in Division II Group A
2016: 6th in Division I Group B
2017: 4th in Division II Group A
2018: 4th in Division II Group A
2019: 5th in Division II Group A
2020: Cancelled due to the COVID-19 pandemic
2021: Cancelled due to the COVID-19 pandemic

References

External links
South Korea at IIHF.com

Ice hockey in South Korea
National under-18 ice hockey teams
Ice hockey